is a major Japanese horse breeding farm located in Abira, Hokkaido. The farm is part of the Shadai Group, and has continuously been the leading breeder of thoroughbred horses for 12 consecutive years from 2010 to 200.

According to the Racing Post, it is the centre of the Japanese racehorse breeding industry. It is home to over 3000 horses, worth of $100 million.

Timeline

Shadai Farm Hayakita-era 

 1967 - Zenya Yoshida founds the Shadai Farm Hayakita in the town of Hayakita (now Abira).
 1976 - Northern Taste arrives at the farm. 
 1980 - Shadai Diners Thoroughbred Club (future Shadai Thoroughbred Club) founded
 1988 - Japan Diners Thoroughbred Club (future Sunday Thoroughbred Cllub) founded
 1989 - Tony Bin arrives at the farm
 1991 - Sunday Silence arrives at the farm
 1993 - Zenya Yoshida passes away on August 13.

Northern Farm-era 

 1994 - Shadai Farm Hayakita is rebranded as the Northern Farm on January.
 1999 - One of their bred horses, Shiva, becomes the first Japanese-bred horse to win a foreign Grade 1 race.
 1999 - Wins the Leading Breeder title for the first time. Since then, Northern Farm has consistently been either the breeding leader of Japan or in second place.
 2005 - Deep Impact, one of the horses bred at the farm, becomes a Triple Crown Winner
 2010 - Apapane, one of the horses bred at the farm, becomes a Filly Triple Crown Winner
At the same time, Northern Farm pulled out of Shadai's Yamamoto Training Center in Miyagi.
 2012 - Gentildonna, one of the horses bred at the farm, becomes a Filly Triple Crown Winner
 2018 - Almond Eye, one of the horses bred at the farm, becomes a Filly Triple Crown Winner

See also 

 Shadai Stallion Station

References

External links
 Official web site

Horse farms
Farms in Japan